is a Japanese actress and gravure model. She is one of the models featured in the video game Need for Speed: ProStreet, and acts alongside fellow professional model Krystal Forscutt. She also performed a minor voice role in the Japanese-language version of the video game Onimusha: Dawn of Dreams. Her favourite sport is volleyball.

Filmography

Dramas

DVDs

Notes

External links
Orangenic OFFICIAL WEBSITE
Sayoko official blog

1985 births
Japanese gravure idols
Japanese television personalities
Living people
Actors from Chiba Prefecture
Models from Chiba Prefecture